Christina Zerbe (born 12 September 1980) is a German footballer. She played for 1. FFC Frankfurt, until 2010, and was capped 12 times for the German national team between 2000 and 2003.

Career

Club 
 TSV Aue-Wingeshausen (1995–1996)
 Sportfreunde Birkelbach (1996–1997)
 Sportfreunde Siegen (1997–2001)
 FFC Brauweiler Pulheim (2001–2002)
 1. FFC Frankfurt (2002–2010)
 SG Bornheim Grün-Weiss (2010–2011)

International 
 Germany U-19 (1998–1999)
 Germany (2000–2003)

Achievements

Club

1. FFC Frankfurt 
 UEFA Women's Champions League (2006)
 Bundesliga (2003, 2005, 2007)
 DFB-Pokal (2003, 2007)

Personal life 
Zerbe teaches at the Engelbert Humperdinck elementary school, Frankfurt.

References

External links 
 Interview

1980 births
Living people
German women's footballers
Germany women's international footballers
Sportspeople from Siegen
1. FFC Frankfurt players
Women's association football defenders
Footballers from North Rhine-Westphalia